The Tüp Botanical Reserve is located in Tüp District, Issyk-Kul Region, Kyrgyzstan. It was established in 1975 with a purpose of conservation of Savin Juniper (Juniperus sabina).  The botanical reserve occupies 100 hectares. Among other flora species inhabiting the reserve are willow, barberry, Caragana, etc.

References

Issyk-Kul Region
Botanical reserves in Kyrgyzstan
Protected areas established in 1975